Gatharaini is a settlement in Kenya's Nairobi Province.

References 

Populated places in Nairobi Province